Sanjay Kishan Kaul is currently the Most senior judge of Supreme Court of India. He is former chief justice of Madras High Court and Punjab and Haryana High Court and former judge of Delhi High Court. He has also served as acting chief justice of Delhi High Court.

Personal life

Early life and education 
A native of Srinagar, Sanjay Kishan Kaul was born on 26 December 1958 to a Kashmiri Hindu Brahmin family. Kaul hails from the family of the Dattatreya Kauls of Srinagar. His great-great-grandfather, Raja Suraj Kishan Kaul, was the Revenue minister in the Regency council of the princely state of Jammu and Kashmir. His great-grandfather, Sir Daya Kishan Kaul, was a statesman and diplomat who served as the finance minister of Jammu & Kashmir state. His grandfather, Raja Upinder Kishen Kaul, had a distinguished career in public service. Kaul's brother, Neeraj Kishan Kaul, was also a judge of the Delhi High court, having been appointed in the summer of 2009.

After schooling in Modern School, New Delhi, Sanjay Kishan Kaul graduated in economics (Hons.) from Delhi University, studying in St. Stephen's College, Delhi. He then took a degree in law, studying at the Faculty of Law, University of Delhi, taking the LLB in 1982.

Interests and associations 
Kaul is a member of various prestigious institutions like Indian International center, India Law Institute, India Habitat Center, Roshanara club amongst others. Theatre, music, golf & reading, including subjects unrelated to law are amongst his other areas of interest.

Career

As a lawyer 
During his 19-year career, he handled mainly commercial, civil & writ matters in Delhi high court & Supreme court of India.

As a judge 
Kaul was appointed additional judge of Delhi high court on 3 May 2001, and was made a permanent judge in 2003. He was also the acting chief justice of Delhi high court in September 2012.
He became Chief Justice of Punjab and Haryana High Court in June 2013.

As a chancellor 

The chancellor of TNDALU is the chief justice of Madras high court. Hence he served as the chancellor of TNDALU and he has also visited the college and addressed the students.[8]

Notable judgments 
In the year 2017, on 24 August, Kaul along with eight judges ruled in favour of Privacy being a Fundamental Right, which is a watershed moment in the history of Constitutional Jurisprudence of India.
 2008 Judgement as Delhi HC Judge, where Kaul dismissed the charges levied against M F Husain for his painting of a lady later termed as 'Bharat Mata', accusing him of obscenity. Upholding free speech and expression, Kaul expressed agreement with Husain's contention that there was no deliberate intention on his part to hurt anybody's religious feeling as the figure actually represented an "anthropomorphic depiction of a nation" in the form of a distressed woman. Kaul in his conclusion mentions, Pluralism is the soul of democracy. There should be freedom for the thought we hate. Freedom of speech has no meaning if there is no freedom after speech. The reality of democracy is to be measured by the extent of freedom and accommodation it extends.

References 

8.http://www.thehindu.com/news/cities/Tiruchirapalli/Process-of-selecting-V-C-for-law-school-under-way-says-Chief-Justice/article15422011.ece

Kashmiri Hindus
Kashmiri Pandits
Living people
1958 births
Chief Justices of the Punjab and Haryana High Court
St. Stephen's College, Delhi alumni
Judges of the Delhi High Court
Kashmiri people
Chief Justices of the Madras High Court
20th-century Indian judges
21st-century Indian judges
Justices of the Supreme Court of India
Modern School (New Delhi) alumni
Indian people of Kashmiri descent